In algebra, a measuring coalgebra of two algebras A and B is a coalgebra enrichment of the set of homomorphisms from A to B. In other words, if coalgebras are thought of as a sort of linear analogue of sets, then the measuring coalgebra is a sort of linear analogue of the set of homomorphisms from A to B. In particular its group-like elements are (essentially) the homomorphisms from A to B. Measuring coalgebras were introduced by .

Definition

A coalgebra C with a linear map from C×A to B is said to measure A to B if it preserves the algebra product and identity (in the coalgebra sense). If we think of the elements of C as linear maps from A to B, this means that c(a1a2) = Σc1(a1)c2(a2) where Σc1⊗c2 is the coproduct of c, and c multiplies identities by the counit of c. In particular if c is grouplike this just states that c is a homomorphism from A to B. A measuring coalgebra is a universal coalgebra that measures A to B in the sense that any coalgebra that measures A to B can be mapped to it in a unique natural way.

Examples

The group-like elements of a measuring coalgebra from A to B are the homomorphisms from A to B.
The primitive elements of a measuring coalgebra from A to B are the derivations from A to B.
If A is the algebra of continuous real functions on a compact Hausdorff space X, and B is the real numbers, then the measuring coalgebra from A to B can be identified with finitely supported measures on X. This may be the origin of the term "measuring coalgebra".
In the special case when A = B, the measuring coalgebra has a natural structure of a Hopf algebra, called the Hopf algebra of the algebra A.

References

 

Coalgebras